The Recife Law School, now called Law School, Federal University of Pernambuco (formerly in Portuguese Faculdade de Direito do Recife and now Faculdade de Direito da Universidade Federal de Pernambuco), is a law school in the city of Recife, Pernambuco state, Brazil.

History
The Recife Law School was one of the first superior education centres created in Brazil. It was created (together with the Faculdade de Direito da Universidade de São Paulo) on August 11, 1827, by an imperial law of Dom Pedro I, of Brazil. It was first located in the city of Olinda, and then moved to Recife in 1854. Since 1912 it has been located in its own palace at the square Dr. Adolfo Cirne in downtown Recife.

Since its beginning, the Recife Law School was important not only for graduating bachelors in law but also for being a centre of excellence in philosophy and human sciences. It is one of the most important superior education centres in Brazil. 

Between 1860 and 1960 a social, philosophic, intellectual movement known as "" (the Recife's school) influenced positivist philosophy and its understanding.
Many of the most remarkable Brazilian politicians, poets, sociologists and lawyers studied there such as Tobias Barreto, Teixeira de Freitas, Assis Chateaubriand, Rio Branco, Nilo Peçanha, Eusébio de Queirós, Epitácio Pessoa, Castro Alves, Sílvio Romero, João Pessoa, Clóvis Beviláqua, Capistrano de Abreu, Graça Aranha, Araripe Júnior, Pontes de Miranda, Barbosa Lima Sobrinho, José Lins do Rego, Paulo Freire, Ariano Suassuna, Zacarias de Góis e Vasconcelos, Rosa e Silva, Sinimbu, Paranaguá, João Alfredo, José Linhares, and Câmara Cascudo.

Its graduation course has approximately 970 students and has received the excellency award from the Order of the lawyers of Brazil (OAB) – Ordem do Advogados do Brasil. The Recife Law School has one of the most important juridical libraries in Brazil, with more than 100,000 books, many of them rare.

Bibliography 

 BEVILAQUA, Clóvis - História da Faculdade de Direito do Recife. 2. ed. Brasília: INL; Conselho Federal de Cultura, 1977.
 FRANCA, Rubem - Monumentos do Recife. Recife: Governo de Pernambuco, SEC, 1977. p. 175.
 PARAÍSO, Rostand Carneiro Leão - A casa de Octávio de Freitas: memória apresentada à Academia Pernambucana de Letras, 1977.
 PINTO FERREIRA, Luís - História da Faculdade de Direito do Recife. Recife: UFPE, Ed. Universitária, 1980.

Law schools in Brazil
Educational institutions established in 1827
1827 establishments in Brazil
Federal University of Pernambuco